The Strathroy Rockets are a junior ice hockey team based in Strathroy, Ontario, Canada. They play in the Western division of the Greater Ontario Junior Hockey League.

History

In 1965, the Rockets joined the old Western Junior "B" league.  When most of the league became the Western Junior A league in 1968, the Rockets were not invited.  Instead, the team joined the Central "B" league for a year, before moving to the Western Junior B league in 1969, and ceased operations in 1972.  The Falcons replaced the Rockets and moved to the Western Junior "D".  The team became the Blades in 1975 rejoined the newly re-formed Western "B" league.  In 1994, they once again became the Rockets and stayed in the Western "B" ever since.

The Rockets won the WOJHL title in 2006-07, defeating the Sarnia Blast in seven games. They were then defeated by the Cambridge WinterHawks in the Sutherland Cup final.

2021-22 coaching staff
President - Kent Coleman
 Past Presidents
  Charlie Milhomens 2014 - 2015
  Don Van Massenhoven 2009 - 2014
  Dale Wurfel 2006 - 2009
General manager - Kent Coleman
Assistant general manager - Jake Jefferey
Assistant general manager - Jason Furlong
Coaching Staff Advisor - Clare Moffatt
Head coach - Jason Williams
Assistant coach - Mitch McNeill
Assistant coach - Brady Vandenberk
Assistant coach - Patrick McNeill
Trainer - Mike Brooks
Equipment manager - Marty Grigg

Season-by-season results

Sutherland Cup appearances

1969: Markham Waxers defeated Strathroy Rockets 4 games to 2
2007: Cambridge Winterhawks defeated Strathroy Rockets  4 games to none

Notable alumni
Brian Campbell
Jeff Carter
Doug Crossman
Dale Hunter
Jared Keeso (actor)
Craig MacTavish
Andy McDonald
Patrick O'Sullivan
Mike Stapleton
Don Van Massenhoven
Jason Williams

Other
Rockets Webpage
GOJHL Webpage

Strathroy-Caradoc
Western Junior B Hockey League teams